Year 1104 (MCIV) was a leap year starting on Friday (link will display the full calendar) of the Julian calendar.

Events 
 By place 

 Byzantine Empire 
 Summer – The Byzantines re-occupy the Cilician cities of Tarsus, Adana and Mamistra. A naval squadron, under Admiral Cantacuzenus, pursues in Cypriot waters a Genoese raiding fleet, and sails on to Latakia, where they capture the harbour and the lower city. Bohemond I reinforces the garrison in the citadel.

 Levant 
 Spring – The Crusaders, led by Bohemond I, re-invade the territory of Aleppo, and try to capture the town of Kafar Latha. The attack fails, owing to the resistance of the local Banu tribe. Meanwhile, Joscelin of Courtenay cuts the communications between Aleppo and the Euphrates.
 May 7 – Battle of Harran: The Crusaders under Baldwin II are defeated by the Seljuk Turks. Baldwin and Joscelin of Courtenay are taken prisoner. Tancred (nephew of Bohemond I) becomes regent of Edessa. The defeat at Harran marks a key turning point of Crusader expansion. 
 May 26 – King Baldwin I captures Acre, the port is besieged from April, and blockaded by the Genoese and Pisan fleet. Baldwin promises a free passage to those who want to move to Ascalon, but the Italian sailors plunder the wealthy Muslim emigrants and kill many of them.
 Autumn – Bohemond I departs to Italy for reinforcements. He takes with him gold and silver, and precious stuff to raise an army against Emperor Alexios I (Komnenos). Tancred becomes co-ruler over Antioch – and appoints his brother-in-law, Richard of Salerno, as his deputy.
 Toghtekin, Seljuk ruler (atabeg) of Damascus, founds a short-lived principality in Syria (the first example of a series of Seljuk ruled dynasties).

 England 
 September 3 – St. Cuthbert is reburied in Durham Cathedral.

 Europe 
 September 28 – Alfonso I (the Battler) becomes king of Aragon and Navarre (after the death of his half-brother Peter I).
 King David IV (the Builder) of Georgia defeats 100,000 Seljuk Turks with only 1,500 warriors (approximate date).
 Sultan Kilij Arslan I of the Sultanate of Rum starts a war with the Danishmendids.
 The Venetian Arsenal is founded in Venice.

 By topic 

 Volcanology 
 Autumn – The volcano Hekla erupts in Iceland and devastates farms for 45 miles (some 70 km) around.

 Religion 
 April 21 – The new basilica at Vézelay Abbey (located in northern Burgundy) in France is dedicated.

Births 
 Euphrosyne of Polotsk, Kievan princess (d. 1167)
 Fujiwara no Kiyosuke, Japanese waka poet (d. 1177)
 Gens du Beaucet, French hermit and saint (d. 1127)
 Ibn Zafar al Siqilli, Arab-Sicilian politician (d. 1170)
 Robert de Beaumont, 2nd Earl of Leicester (d. 1168)
 Vladimir Volodarevich, Galician prince (d. 1152)
 Waleran de Beaumont, 1st Earl of Worcester (d. 1166)

Deaths 
 June 8 – Duqaq, Seljuk ruler of Damascus
 September 25 – Simon II, French nobleman
 October 26 – Johann I, bishop of Speyer
 Al-Mansur ibn al-Nasir, Hammadid ruler
 Danishmend Gazi, ruler of the Danishmends
 Ebontius (or Ebon), bishop of Barbastro
 Herewald of Llandaff, Welsh bishop
 Peter I, king of Aragon and Navarre
 Seraphin, archbishop of Esztergom
 Serlo, Norman cleric and abbot
 Sökmen, governor of Jerusalem
 Svend Tronkræver, Danish prince

References